Tenali–Repalle branch line is a electrified single track railway section in South Central Railway zone. Electrification of the section will be taken and the budget for the same was allocated in the year 2018–19.

History 

Tenali–Repalle branch line, a part of Guntur–Repalle broad-gauge project was opened in January 1916, which was then owned by Madras and Southern Mahratta Railway.

Jurisdiction 

References

External links 

Rail transport in Andhra Pradesh

1916 establishments in India
Transport in Guntur district
5 ft 6 in gauge railways in India